Easton is a city in Faribault County, Minnesota, United States. The population was 199 at the 2010 census.

History
Easton had its start when the railroad was extended to that point. The town was platted in 1873, and named for one of its founders, Jason Clark Easton. A post office has been in operation at Easton since 1874.

Geography

Demographics

2010 census
As of the census of 2010, there were 199 people, 89 households, and 63 families residing in the city. The racial makeup of the city was 97.5% White, 0.5% Native American, and 2.0% from other races. Hispanic or Latino of any race were 4.0% of the population.

There were 89 households, of which 28.1% had children under the age of 18 living with them, 51.7% were married couples living together, 10.1% had a female householder with no husband present, 9.0% had a male householder with no wife present, and 29.2% were non-families. 24.7% of all households were made up of individuals, and 13.5% had someone living alone who was 65 years of age or older. The average household size was 2.24 and the average family size was 2.54.

The median age in the city was 44.9 years. 22.6% of residents were under the age of 18; 4.9% were between the ages of 18 and 24; 22.5% were from 25 to 44; 30.1% were from 45 to 64; and 19.6% were 65 years of age or older. The gender makeup of the city was 49.7% male and 50.3% female.

2000 census
As of the census of 2000, there were 214 people, 93 households, and 57 families residing in the city. The racial makeup of the city was 100.00% White.

There were 93 households, out of which 23.7% had children under the age of 18 living with them, 53.8% were married couples living together, 4.3% had a female householder with no husband present, and 38.7% were non-families. 29.0% of all households were made up of individuals, and 15.1% had someone living alone who was 65 years of age or older.  The average household size was 2.30 and the average family size was 2.88.

In the city, the population was spread out, with 20.6% under the age of 18, 8.4% from 18 to 24, 25.7% from 25 to 44, 25.2% from 45 to 64, and 20.1% who were 65 years of age or older.  The median age was 42 years. For every 100 females, there were 103.8 males.  For every 100 females age 18 and over, there were 102.4 males.

The median income for a household in the city was $28,125, and the median income for a family was $30,625. Males had a median income of $25,000 versus $18,750 for females. The per capita income for the city was $17,095.  About 11.1% of families and 14.7% of the population were below the poverty line, including 16.7% of those under the age of eighteen and none of those 65 or over.

References

External links
 
City website
City-Data.com
ePodunk 

Cities in Minnesota
Cities in Faribault County, Minnesota